Saint Lucia is an island country in the Caribbean.

Saint Lucia, St. Lucia or Sta. Lucia may also refer to:

Places

Australia
 St Lucia, Queensland, a riverside suburb in the City of Brisbane, Queensland, Australia
 Saint Lucia, Francisco Morazan, a town in Honduras.

South Africa
 St Lucia, KwaZulu-Natal, a settlement in Umkhanyakude District Municipality in the KwaZulu-Natal province of South Africa
 Lake St. Lucia, in KwaZulu-Natal

United States
 St. Lucia County, Florida, former Florida county from 1844 to 1855

Other uses
 Saint Lucy, third-century Christian saint also known as Saint Lucia
 Saint Lucia amazon, a species of parrot in the family Psittacidae
 Saint Lucia lancehead, a endangered species of venomous snake from the West Indies
 Saint Lucia oriole, a species of bird, in the family Icteridae and genus Icterus
 Saint Lucia Labour Party, a social democratic political party in Saint Lucia
 St. Lucia (musician), a South African singer and musician
 St. Lucia, song by the singer Future
 Sta. Lucia Realtors, a basketball team in the Philippines
 Sta. Lucia Mall, a shopping mall in Cainta, Rizal

See also
 Lucia (disambiguation)
 Lucian (disambiguation)
 Saint Lucian (disambiguation)
 Saint Lucy (disambiguation)
 Santa Lucia (disambiguation)
 Santa Luzia (disambiguation)
 St. Lucie (disambiguation)